The Westerbecker Berg is a forested hill in the Teutoburg Forest and, at  , the highest point in Tecklenburg Land, the county of Steinfurt and the administrative region of Münster in the German state of North Rhine-Westphalia.

Location 
The Westerbecker Berg lies in the TERRA.vita Nature Park (formerly the North Teutoburg Forest and Wiehen Hills Nature Park) in the municipality of Lienen north of the farming community of Westerbeck. To the south and southwest of the hill the terrain transitions into the Münsterland Park Landscape of Münsterland which enables very good long-distance views.

History 
The historical trade route known as the Hermannsweg, now a long-distance trail, runs over the Westerbecker Berg. The trail runs along the crest of the hills that form the Teutoburg Forest from Rheine to Velmerstot in the Egge.

Quarries on the hillsides recall the once flourishing extraction of limestone here. As a result, a cableway was built to the Hüggel, which may be seen to the north-northeast. Limestone was transported on the Hüggelbahn to the Georgsmarienhütte works and used as aggregate limestone (Zuschlagskalk).

References 

Mountains and hills of North Rhine-Westphalia
Steinfurt (district)
Teutoburg Forest